Salvatore was a Norwegian instrumental rock band influenced by post-rock, electronica and kraut-rock that was formed in 1998, lasting until 2008.

History
The band was founded in Oslo in 1998 by John Birger Wormdahl together with  Ola Fløttum, Bjarne Larsen and Kjell-Olav Jørgensen. A session of listening to German kraut-rock band Neu! provided the impetus for the formation of the band.

The band was among the winners of the Norwegian music contest Zoom in 1998 and as a winner went on a Zoom-tour in Norway, England and Scotland in the spring of 1999. 

In 2000 they recorded their debut album Clingfilm . During easter of 2000 the band traveled to Morocco with the Norwegian theater group De Utvalgte (the Chosen Ones). In Morocco they recorded the albums Jugend - A New Hedonism, recorded as the soundtrack to the theater group's production of The Picture of Dorian Gray. The band releases Clingfilm in October and Jugend in November 2002 on the record label Racing Junior.

Jon Platou Selvig joins the band in 2001 and the album Fresh is released in October. In 2002 the percussionist Karim Sayed joins the band. 

Their fourth album Tempo was recorded in Chicago by John McEntire and wins the Spellemannprisen 2002 award for best record in the electronica genre. In the same year Salvatore also participated in the Earworm compilation A Charabang Trip To The Lights.

Their fifth album Luxus was recorded in Oslo in 2003 by Ingar Hunskaar and is mixed by John McEntire in Chicago in 2004. In 2003, Ola Fløttum leaves the band and Fresh is licensed and released by the San Diego label Rocketracer. 

In 2004 Jørgen Skjulstad joins Salvatore and the band embarks on their first European tour in January. In April Luxus is released and they tour Europe in June as a supporting band to Tortoise. In 2005 the band goes on tours to Germany, Austria, Italy and the Balkans; Jon Platou Selvig quits the band and Leon Muraglia joins the band.

In 2007 Salvatore releases Days of Rage, their sixth and last album, on New Year's Day. Anthony Barratt joins the band prior to the release. Days of Rage goes on to win Spellemansprisen 2007 award, again in the electronica genre.

After ten years, the band chooses to dissolve itself in June 2008, due to the logistical problems of co-coordinating an ever changing and increasing band membership and a feeling that they were not progressing creatively anymore.

Three of the four original members, John Birger Wormdahl Bjarne Larsen and Kjell-Olav Jørgensen, have formed the band Masselys.

Discography
 Clingfilm (2000)
 Jugend – A New Hedonism (2000)
 Fresh (2001)
 Tempo (2002)
 Luxus (2004)
 Days of Rage (2007)

Members 
 Bjarne Larsen: guitar, bass guitar (1998–2008)
 John Birger Wormdahl: keyboard, guitar, sampling (1998–2008)
 Kjell-Olav Jørgensen: drums (1998–2008)
 Karim Sayed: trommer, percussion (2002–2008)
 Leon Muraglia: electronics (2005–2008)
 Anthony Barratt: guitar (2006–2008)
 Ola Fløttum: guitar, bass (1998–2003)
 Jon Platou Selvig: sampling, keyboard (2001–2005)
 Jørgen Skjulstad/DJ Sissyfus: misc. instruments (2004–2006)

References

External links
Salvatore.no - Official website
Racingjunior.com - Record label

Norwegian post-rock groups
Norwegian electronic music groups
Norwegian progressive rock groups
Musical groups established in 1998
1998 establishments in Norway
Musical groups disestablished in 2008
2008 disestablishments in Norway
Musical groups from Oslo